Mackay is the central suburb and the central business district of the city of Mackay in the Mackay Region, Queensland, Australia.

Geography 
Kemmis is a neighbourhood at the southern edge of the suburb. It was the location of the former Kemmis railway station on the North Coast railway line until the line was diverted to avoid the city centre .

History 
The suburb takes its name from the town, which in turn was named after explorer John Mackay, who led an 1860 expedition into the Pioneer Valley.

The name Kemmis refers to Arthur Kemmis, a member of William Landsborough's 1861 expedition from the Gulf of Carpentaria to Melbourne in search of the Burke and Wills expedition. Kemmis was a partner in the lease of Fort Cooper pastoral run.

Mackay Primary School opened on 12 December 1871. Between 1872 and 1877, it was known as Port Mackay Primary School before becoming Mackay Primary School again. On 28 September 1885, the school was separated into Mackay Boys State School and Mackay Girls and Infants State School. The two schools were amalgamated again on 11 July 1932 to form Mackay Central State School.

St Patrick's College opened on 22 September 1929.

Mackay Opportunity School opened in 1960. On 29 August 1981, it was renamed Mackay Special School. It closed on 7 May 1997.

Kutta Mulla Gorinna Special Assistance School opened in 2018.

Education 
Mackay Central State School is a government primary (Prep-6) school for boys and girls at Alfred Street. In 2018, the school had an enrolment of 177 students with 11 teachers and 9 non-teaching staff (5 full-time equivalent).

St Patrick's College is a Catholic secondary (11-12) school for boys and girls at Gregory Street. In 2018, the school had an enrolment of 442 students with 37 teachers (36 full-time equivalent) and 24 non-teaching staff (19 full-time equivalent).

Kutta Mulla Gorinna Special Assistance School is a private secondary school for students who are vulnerable and disengaged from the conventional school system.  It is open to all such students, but has particular emphasis on support for Aboriginal and Torres Strait Islander students.

There is no government secondary school in the central suburb of Mackay. The nearest is Mackay State High School in neighbouring South Mackay to the south.

References

External links 
 
 

Suburbs of Mackay, Queensland
Central business districts in Australia